Aun Chaudhry is a Pakistani politician who has been an advisor to the Prime Minister of Pakistan on tourism and sports since April 2022.

He previously served as Chief Coordinator to the Chief Minister of Punjab, Usman Buzdar, from December 2020 to August 2021. He is the brother of dissident PTI MPA Amin Chaudhry, who voted for Hamza Shehbaz in the 2022 Chief Minister of Punjab Elections. In 2018, soon after the general elections, Aun was appointed as Advisor to Chief Minister Punjab, in which position he served until 2020. He was asked to resign from the Punjab Cabinet after the sugar scandal cases against Jahangir Tareen; however, the Punjab government denied receiving his resignation. Later he was dismissed from his office. Imran Khan expelled him from PTI in July 2021.

References 

Pakistan Tehreek-e-Insaf politicians
Living people
Year of birth missing (living people)
Place of birth missing (living people)